Paralepetopsis sasakii is a species of sea snail, a true limpet, a marine gastropod mollusk in the family Neolepetopsidae, one of the families of true limpets.

The specific name sasakii is in honor of Takenori Sasaki, the malacologist from the University Museum, the University of Tokyo.

Description

Distribution 
This small impet occurs at methane seeps in deep water off the Congo River.

References

External links

Neolepetopsidae
Gastropods described in 2009